Dolcedo (locally ) is a comune (municipality) in the Province of Imperia in the Italian region Liguria, located about  southwest of Genoa and about  northwest of Imperia.

The communal seat, Piazza, is located in the lower valley of the Prino stream. The other main centers are Isolalunga, Costa Carnara, Bellissimi and Lecchiore. Dolcedo borders the following municipalities: Badalucco, Civezza, Imperia, Montalto Ligure, Pietrabruna, Prelà, Taggia, and Vasia.

History
The boroughs of Dolcedo appeared in the early Middle Ages, populated by refugees from the Ligurian coast. Later it was a fief of the Clavesana family. In the 12th century cultivation of olive became a mainstay of the area. In 1228 the Clavesana ceded their lands to the commune of Genoa.

Main sights
Parish church of St. Thomas, in Baroque style (1613).
Medieval church of Santa Maria di Castellazzo.
Sanctuary of Acquasanta.
Oratory of St. Lawrence, with two small bell towers.
Chapel of St. Brigida (15th century).

Demographic evolution

See also
Liguria wine

References

External links
 www.comune.dolcedo.im.it

Cities and towns in Liguria